The 2004 Vietnamese National U-18 Football Championship is the first edition of the Vietnamese National U-18 Football Championship, the annual youth football tournament organised by the Vietnam Football Federation (VFF) for male players under-18

Qualified teams
Hải Phòng
Sông Lam Nghệ An
Thành Long
Đồng Tháp
Đà Nẵng
Phú Yên
An Giang
Tiền Giang

Venues
Lạch Tray Stadium

Final

References

External links
 Bongdaplus

Youth football in Vietnam
2004 in Vietnamese football
Under-18 association football
Vietnamese National U-18 Football Championship